Daphne penicillata is a shrub, of the family Thymelaeaceae.  It is native to China, specifically Sichuan.

Description
The shrub's yellowish or grayish brown branches grow densely. It is often found on arid slopes and in forests at altitudes of 1200 to 1700 m.

References

penicillata